Ebenezer Don Carlos Bassett (October 16, 1833 – November 13, 1908) was United States Ambassador to Haiti from 1869 to 1877. He was the first African American diplomat and the fourth U.S. ambassador to Haiti since the two countries established relations in 1862. His mother was Pequot. From 1857 to 1869 he was the principal of the Institute for Colored Youth in Philadelphia.

Ebenezer Bassett was appointed as new leaders emerged among free African Americans after the American Civil War. An educator, abolitionist, and civil rights activist, Bassett was the U.S. diplomatic envoy in 1869 to Haiti, the "Black Republic" of the Western Hemisphere. Through eight years of bloody civil war and coups d'état there, Bassett served in one of the most crucial, but difficult postings of his time. Haiti was of strategic importance in the Caribbean basin for its shipping lanes and as a naval coaling station.

Early life
Born in Derby, Connecticut, Ebenezer D. Bassett was from a community that had a strong tradition of owning their own property, running their own businesses, and playing important leadership roles. Among this community, the Bassetts stood out as astute and prominent. Bassett's father Eben Tobias, as well as his grandfather Tobiah, had the distinction of being elected "Black Governor" in Connecticut, an unofficial honorific among the black community.

Both Bassett's parents ensured that their son would receive the best education possible. In a step rare for any students of the mid-19th century, Bassett attended college in his home state. In 1853 he was the first black student to attend the Connecticut Normal School (now Central Connecticut State University). After graduation Bassett taught school in New Haven, where he met and became friends with the abolitionist Frederick Douglass.

Educator and activist

Soon Bassett was offered the chance to teach at a progressive new all-Black high school in Philadelphia. At the time, he was teaching at the Institute for Colored Youth (ICY). It later became Cheyney University of Pennsylvania, the earliest college dedicated to educating Black youth in the country. There he focused on Latin, Greek, mathematics and science, becoming principal after one year. Among his students was John H. Smythe, who would also become a diplomat, Smythe to Liberia. But Pennsylvania, like the rest of the country, was soon dragged into the American Civil War.

Ebenezer Bassett also became one of Philadelphia's leading voices for abolition of slavery and emancipation of the nearly four million enslaved Blacks. Bassett used ICY as a base to recruit Blacks to serve in the Union Army. He hastened to invite many of the national civil rights leaders who had become colleagues. Just days after the Battle of Gettysburg, Bassett and other Black leaders organized a recruiting drive for Black soldiers. Bassett had the honor of being the second speaker of the night, making his speech immediately preceding Frederick Douglass.

Basset was highly respected within the academic communities of the North.  He attended educational meetings and advised abolitionists on matters of education.   In New Haven Connecticut August 1865, a meeting was held by The American Institute to address the issue of freedman and education.  Speeches were made by prominent members of the community.  Benjamin B. Smith Bishop of Kentucky, John Celivergos Zachos educational theorist, Lyman Abbott Author, Thomas Anthony Thacher Yale College administrator, Rev. M.E. Strieby D.D. secretary American Missionary Association of New York.  Ebenezer Basset attended the meeting and urged the need for more African American educators in the freed states, he felt freedman would have more confidence in their teachers.

His remaining years as an educator and activist would cement his position in the abolitionist community.  When Ulysses S Grant was elected to the presidency, he looked for Black leaders such as Bassett to fill important political positions. Douglass recommended Bassett to political allies in the White House.

Diplomatic career
In nominating Bassett to become Minister Resident to Haiti (the title Ambassador would not be used by the U.S. until 1893), Grant appointed him as one of the highest-ranking blacks in the U.S. government. Bassett's accreditation to the "Black Republic" was no accident either. Though Haiti had gained its independence from France in 1804, it was not officially recognized by the United States until 1862. Southern resistance to a former colony governed by ex-slaves becoming a "nation" had prevented the United States from recognizing the country. With the Union victory in the Civil War, the US government wanted to improve bilateral relations, and believed the appointment of Bassett was a significant step, not only for his skills but for the symbolism of his appointment.

Upon arrival in Port-au-Prince, however, Bassett found that Haiti was torn by civil war. Although with no international experience, as a representative of the US, the Minister Resident was one of the most powerful figures in the country. Bassett soon realized that much of diplomacy involved intangibles. Soon after his arrival, he wrote to Frederick Douglass that his duties were "not so onerous as delicate. Common sense and some little knowledge of law…will carry me through." 

Bassett oversaw cases of citizen commercial claims, diplomatic immunity for consular and commercial agents, and aid to citizens affected by hurricanes, fires and numerous tropical diseases.

Canal crisis

The case that posed the greatest challenge to him, however, was political refugee General Pierre Théoma Boisrond-Canal. The general was among the band of young leaders who in 1869 successfully ousted the former President Sylvain Salnave from power. By the time of the subsequent regime of Michel Domingue in the mid-1870s, Canal had retired to his home outside the capital. The new Haitian President, however, suspicious of rivals, hunted down perceived threats, including Canal.

Canal and two young relatives arrived at Bassett's home, seeking protection and refuge. The diplomat agreed to protect them under his diplomatic immunity.

As a refugee, Canal had been essentially held captive by the government threat for more than five months. After Canal's departure, Bassett telegrammed the Department of State informing them that the crisis had finally passed: "Refugees amicably embarked and soldiers withdrawn from around my premises yesterday."

Though he undoubtedly paid a price by having irritated the powers that ran the State Department, he nonetheless stood up to both the Secretary of State and the brutal Domingue dictatorship. By demanding humane treatment for an honorable Haitian citizen, Ebenezer Bassett served not only the best interests of the United States, but also of the people of Haiti.

Upon the end of the Grant Administration in 1877, Bassett submitted his resignation as was customary with a change of hands in government. In spite of any lingering resentment that may have existed in Washington because of his defiant stance, it was impossible for the Department not to recognize Bassett's work.

Acting Secretary of State F.W. Seward wrote to Bassett, thanking him for his years of service:

I cannot allow this opportunity to pass without expressing to you the appreciation of the Department for the very satisfactory manner in which you have discharged your duties of the mission at Port-au-Prince during your term of office. This commendation of your services is the more especially merited because at various times your duties have been of such a delicate nature as to have required the exercise of much tact and discretion.

Later life
When he returned to the United States, he spent an additional ten years as the Consul General for Haiti in New York City. Prior to his death in Brooklyn, New York, he lived in Philadelphia, where his daughter Charlotte taught at the Institute for Colored Youth. He is buried, with family members, at the Grove Street Cemetery in New Haven, Connecticut.

References

 Teal, Christopher. Hero of Hispaniola - America's First Black Diplomat, Ebenezer D. Bassett, Westport, Conn: Praeger Publishers, 2008
 School Records for Ebenezer D. Bassett, Central Connecticut State University Library, Special Collections.
 "Addresses of the Hon. W. D. Kelley, Miss Anna E. Dickinson, and Mr. Frederick Douglass, at a mass meeting, held at National Hall, Philadelphia, July 6, 1863, for the promotion of colored enlistments." Philadelphia, PA, 1863, African American Pamphlet Collection (Library of Congress).
 Bassett to Douglass, July 3, 1869, Series: General Correspondence 1869, The Frederick Douglass Papers, Library of Congress.
 Hayti, Bassett to Fish, May 8, 1875, M 82, roll 7, Department of State Despatches, National Archives.
 Hayti, Bassett to Fish, May 19, 1875, M 82, roll 8, Department of State Despatches, National Archives.
 Hayti, Bassett to Fish, May 8, 1875, M 82, roll 8, Department of State Despatches, National Archives.
 Hayti, Bassett to Fish, June 8, 1875, M 82, roll 8, Department of State Despatches, National Archives.
 Hayti and Santo Domingo, Fish to Bassett, September 7, 1875, File 77, roll 96, Diplomatic Instruction of the Department of State, National Archives.
 Hayti, Bassett to Fish, October 12, 1875, M 82, roll 8, Department of State Despatches, National Archives.
 Hayti, Bassett to Fish, October 5, 1875, M 82, roll 8, Department of State Despatches, National Archives.
 Hayti, Evarts to Bassett, October 5, 1877, File 77, roll 96, Diplomatic Instruction of the Department of State, National Archives.
 Jackson-Coppin, Fanny. Reminiscences of School Life, and Hints on Teaching, Philadelphia, Pa., L. J. Coppin, 1913, Page 172.

Further reading

 Teal, Christopher. Hero of Hispaniola – America's First Black Diplomat, Ebenezer D. Bassett, Westport, Conn: Praeger Publishers, 2008

1833 births
1908 deaths
People from Derby, Connecticut
People from Brooklyn
Central Connecticut State University alumni
Ambassadors of the United States to Haiti
African Americans in the American Civil War
African-American diplomats
19th-century American diplomats
19th-century American educators
20th-century African-American people